is a stratovolcano located in the Daisetsuzan Volcanic Group of the Ishikari Mountains, Hokkaido, Japan.

See also
List of volcanoes in Japan

References

 Geographical Survey Institute

Volcanoes of Hokkaido
Mountains of Hokkaido
Stratovolcanoes of Japan